Ion Gheorghe Iosif Maurer (23 September 1902 – 8 February 2000) was a Romanian communist politician and lawyer, and the 49th Prime Minister of Romania. He is the longest serving Prime Minister in the history of Romania (having served for 12 years and 343 days).

Biography
Maurer was born in Bucharest to an Alsatian father of German descent and a Romanian mother with petit-bourgeois background. He completed studies in law at the University of Bucharest in 1923, after which he pursued graduate studies at the Sorbonne in Paris. Upon returning to Romania, he became an attorney, practicing law in Sighișoara, then serving as public prosecutor and later judge. In 1932 he went to Bucharest as counsel for several large banks. He became active politically, defending in court members of the illegal leftist and Anti-fascist movements. Occasionally, as in the 1936 Craiova Trial of Romanian Communist Party (PCR) activists, including Ana Pauker, Alexandru Drăghici, and Alexandru Moghioroș, he assisted Lucrețiu Pătrășcanu.

Before 1937, he was briefly active in the Radical Peasants' Party, formed by Grigore Iunian as a splinter group of the National Peasants' Party; however, he was by then already a member of the illegal Communist Party and active in the Agitprop section.

In 1942–1943, during World War II he was imprisoned for his political activity (notably, in the camp at Târgu Jiu), and, as a member of a paramilitary grouping, played a secondary part in the events of 23 August 1944 that led to the downfall of the Ion Antonescu regime. During this time, although present among the few active leaders of the Party around general secretary Ștefan Foriș, he became a supporter of Gheorghe Gheorghiu-Dej's faction (dominated by imprisoned activists). In 1944, he played a hand in Foriș's deposition, assisting Emil Bodnăraș and Gheorghiu-Dej.

After the war, Maurer became a member of the Central Committee of the Romanian Workers' Party (the new name of the PCR after it had incorporated the Social Democratic Party) and took several ministerial positions in the new communist government of Romania — including that of undersecretary of the Communications and Public Works Ministry under Gheorghiu-Dej in the first Petru Groza government. In 1946-1947, he was a member of Romania's delegation to the Paris Peace Conference (headed by Gheorghe Tătărescu) and was briefly employed by Ana Pauker at the Foreign Ministry, before being dismissed for having an unsatisfactory level of political conviction. He was removed from the forefront for the following decade, working for the Institute of Juridical Research.

He supported Gheorghiu-Dej's nationalist policy, eventually becoming foreign minister of Romania in 1957 (replacing Grigore Preoteasa), holding office for six months, and serving in the delegations establishing closer contacts with the People's Republic of China during the Sino-Soviet split and a détente with France in 1959.

Regarded, according to the claims of dissident journalist , as Gheorghiu-Dej's chosen successor, Maurer was head of state (President of the Presidium of the Great National Assembly of Romania) from 1958 to 1961. He took the seat previously occupied by Constantin Pîrvulescu on the Politburo, and then replaced Chivu Stoica as Prime Minister of Romania in 1961. In the latter capacity, he was the recipient of a 1963 letter by the British philosopher and activist Bertrand Russell, who pleaded with the Romanian authorities to free from jail Belu Zilber (a victim of the conflict between the Party leadership and Pătrășcanu, Zilber had been a political prisoner for sixteen years by then). Maurer was also one of three acting Chairmen of the State Council of Romania (heads of state) between March 19 and March 24, 1965.

Alongside Emil Bodnăraș, Maurer was an important member of the Politburo in opposing the ambitions of Gheorghe Apostol and, together with Bodnăraș, helping along the establishment of the Nicolae Ceaușescu regime. Among others, Maurer helped silence potential opposition from inside the Party by withdrawing his support for Corneliu Mănescu and welcoming Ceaușescu's directives, before being himself criticized and sidelined (at the same time as his collaborator Alexandru Bârlădeanu). Pensioned in 1974, he was still present in the forefront at most Party ceremonies.

A prominent member of the nomenklatura for much of his life, he was known for his latent conflict with a large part of the PCR hierarchy. He accumulated a sizable wealth and was known for his ostentatious lifestyle. In 1989, Maurer's earlier support for Ceaușescu led the sidelined PCR members who were planning to state their opposition to the regime by drafting the so-called Letter of the Six (Gheorghe Apostol, Alexandru Bârlădeanu, Silviu Brucan, Constantin Pîrvulescu, and Grigore Răceanu) not to enlist his assistance in the process.

He died in Bucharest a decade after the Romanian Revolution of December 1989, leaving a son, Jean. He was 97.

Notes

References
Ion Alexandrescu, Ion Bulei, Ion Mamina, and Ioan Scurtu, Partidele politice din România, 1862–1994: Enciclopedie, Bucharest, Editura  Mediaprint, 1995; fragment published in Dosarele Istoriei, 12/III 1998, p. 26-27
 Lavinia Betea, "Gheorghe Maurer – "aparător al comuniștilor"", in Jurnalul Național, February 9, 2005
Dennis Deletant, Communist Terror in Romania, C. Hurst & Co., London, 1999; Ceaușescu and the Securitate, M. E. Sharpe, Armonk, New York, 1995
Victor Frunză, Istoria stalinismului în România, Humanitas, Bucharest, 1990
Nicholas Griffin (ed.), The Selected Letters of Bertrand Russell, Routledge, London, 2002
Gabriel Partoș, "Obituary: Ion Gheorghe Maurer" in The Independent, February 15, 2000
Vladimir Tismăneanu, Stalinism pentru eternitate, Polirom, Iași, 2005  (translation of Stalinism for All Seasons: A Political History of Romanian Communism'', University of California Press, Berkeley, 2003)

1902 births
2000 deaths
Politicians from Bucharest
Romanian people of German descent
Carol I National College alumni
Heads of state of Romania
Members of the Great National Assembly
Members of the Chamber of Deputies (Romania)
Titular members of the Romanian Academy
Prime Ministers of Romania
State Council of Romania
Romanian communists
Romanian delegation to the Paris Peace Conference of 1946
Romanian Ministers of Foreign Affairs
Inmates of Târgu Jiu camp
Communism in Romania
20th-century Romanian lawyers
Heads of government who were later imprisoned
University of Bucharest alumni
Presidents of the Romanian Olympic and Sports Committee